Pyry is a male (on rare occasions female as well) Finnish name with the meaning 'snowstorm', and may refer to:

Pyry Hannola, Finnish footballer
Pyry Jaala (Are), Finnish rap artist
Pyry Karjalainen (Puhuva Kone), Finnish rap artist
Pyry Kärkkäinen, Finnish footballer
Pyry Luminen, Finnish architect and designer (female)
Pyry Mikkola, Finnish violinist
Pyry Niskala, Finnish discus thrower
Pyry Rainamaa, Finnish basketball player
Pyry Soiri, Finnish footballer

References

Finnish masculine given names